The Green Bank Observatory (previously National Radio Astronomy Observatory, Green Bank) is an astronomical observatory located in the National Radio Quiet Zone in Green Bank, West Virginia, U.S. It is the operator of the Robert C. Byrd Green Bank Telescope, the world's largest fully steerable radio telescope.

The observatory was established as the National Science Foundation's (NSF) National Radio Astronomy Observatory (NRAO) in 1956 and made its first observations in 1958. It served as the NRAO's headquarters until 1966, after which the facility was known as the National Radio Astronomy Observatory, Green Bank.

In October 2016, the observatory became an independent institution following a 2012 recommendation that the NSF fully divest itself from the facility by October 1, 2016.

Green Bank Observatory subsequently retained partial NSF funding, established private contracts, and formed a partnership with West Virginia University. It is operated by the nonprofit Associated Universities, Inc., under a cooperative agreement with the National Science Foundation.

Active telescopes

 Robert C. Byrd Green Bank Telescope
 140 Foot (43m) Telescope
 20 Meter Telescope
 40 Foot Telescope

Historic and other telescopes

 300 Foot Radio Telescope – suddenly collapsed in November 1988, from the loss of a gusset plate
 Green Bank Interferometer 
 Reber Radio Telescope – designated a National Historic Landmark in 1989
 Howard E. Tatel Radio Telescope — utilized in Project Ozma in 1960, the first search for extraterrestrial intelligence (SETI) with a radio telescope
 45 Foot Telescope

See also
 List of astronomical observatories

References

External links

 
 

 

 
Radio observatories
Astronomy institutes and departments
Organizations based in West Virginia
Research institutes in West Virginia
Research institutes established in 1956
Scientific organizations established in 1956
1956 establishments in West Virginia
National Science Foundation
Buildings and structures in Pocahontas County, West Virginia